is an underground metro station located in Totsuka-ku, Yokohama, Kanagawa, Japan operated by the Yokohama Municipal Subway’s Blue Line (Line 1). It is 9.0 kilometers from the terminus of the Blue Line at Shōnandai Station.

History
Maioka Station was opened on March 14, 1985, as a terminal station the Blue Line. The line was extended to Totsuka by March 24, 1987. Platform screen doors were installed in September 2007.

Lines
Yokohama Municipal Subway
Blue Line

Station layout
Maioka Station has a two underground opposed side platforms.

Platforms

References
 Harris, Ken and Clarke, Jackie. Jane's World Railways 2008-2009. Jane's Information Group (2008).

External links
 Maioka Station (Blue Line) 

Railway stations in Kanagawa Prefecture
Railway stations in Japan opened in 1985
Blue Line (Yokohama)